The Princess Pauline Foundation (Fürstin-Pauline-Stiftung) is an independent Lutheran foundation in Detmold, wholly devoted to charitable purposes and to childcare, youth work and care of the elderly. Previously known as the Paulinenanstalt, it is named after its founder Princess Pauline of Anhalt-Bernburg.

Detmold
Foundations based in Germany